Capraria is a genus of flowering plants in the family Scrophulariaceae.  It is sometimes placed in the families Gratiolaceae, Plantaginaceae, or Veronicaceae. The name is derived from the Latin word caprarius, meaning "pertaining to goats."  This refers to goats being one of the few herbivores that will graze on the plants.

Selected species
Capraria biflora L. – Goatweed	 
Capraria mexicana Moric. ex Benth. – Tamaulipan tea

Formerly placed here
Lindernia crustacea (L.) F.Muell. (as C. crustacea L.)
Leucospora multifida (Michx.) Nutt. (as C. multifida Michx.)

References

External links

Scrophulariaceae
Scrophulariaceae genera